Arabian Adventure is a 1979 British fantasy adventure film directed by Kevin Connor and starring Christopher Lee and Oliver Tobias. The film was shot at Pinewood Studios, Buckinghamshire, U.K.

Premise
An evil caliph (Christopher Lee) offers his daughter's hand in marriage to a prince if he can complete a perilous quest for a magical rose. Helped by a young boy and a magic carpet, Prince Hasan (Oliver Tobias), has to overcome genies, fire breathing monsters and treacherous swamps to reach his prize and claim the hand of Princess Fuleira (Emma Samms).

Cast
Christopher Lee as Voulim Rahbar
Milo O'Shea as Khasim
Oliver Tobias as Prince Hasan
Emma Samms as Princess Zuleira
Puneet Sira as Majeed
Peter Cushing as Wazir Al Wuzara
Capucine as Vahishta
Mickey Rooney as Daad El Shur
John Wyman as Bahloul
John Ratzenberger as Achmed
Shane Rimmer as Abu
Hal Galili as Asaf
Art Malik as Mamhoud
Milton Reid as Jinnee
Elisabeth Welch as Beggarwoman
Suzanne Danielle as Eastern Dancer
Roy Stewart as Nubian

Production
The film was the last of several fantasy movies Connor and Dark made together including The Land That Time Forgot, At the Earth's Core and Warlords of Atlantis. Although it had the biggest budget it was far less successful at the box office. The movie was a throwback to Arabian nights films like The Thief of Bagdad.

Brian Hayles wrote Warlords and John Dark and Connor asked him to write an original Eastern fantasy.

"These Eastern tales abound with lovely excursions into pure fantasy", said John Dark. "It was a very beautiful period and a very beautiful territory. We hope to recreate, in our story, the exciting architecture and costumes, as well as some exciting special effects, like an army of flying carpets. It's an amalgam of a lot of stories, a lot of lore, magic mirrors, wicked spells, 
benign and evil jinnees and one or two very special ideas of our own."

In April 1978 EMI Films announced they would make the film as part of a series of films they wanted to produce with the newly formed Orion Pictures. It did end up being one of Orion's first films, along with the Academy Award-winning A Little Romance, Over the Edge, Promises in the Dark, Heart Beat, The Wanderers and the box office hit 10.

Filming took place in September 1978.

Christopher Lee returned to Britain for the first time in three years to take the lead role. "I couldn't resist it" said Lee. "It's a very fine screenplay by Brian, falling into the true fairy tale genre of romance and beauty combined with the kind of wickedness and violence which has sent delicious shivers down the spines of children of all nations since time immemorial."

Hayles died during filming, on October 30, 1978 shortly after having delivered his first draft of a third original film for Dark and Connor, about pirate ghosts.

References

External links

Arabian Adventure at Letterbox DVD
Review at Cinema Retro

1979 films
1970s fantasy adventure films
British fantasy adventure films
Films shot at Pinewood Studios
Genies in film
Films directed by Kevin Connor
EMI Films films
British Lion Films films
Films scored by Ken Thorne
1970s English-language films
1970s British films